Mall commonly refers to a:
 Shopping mall
 Strip mall
 Pedestrian street
 Esplanade

Mall or MALL may also refer to:

Places

Shopping complexes
 The Mall (Sofia) (Tsarigradsko Mall), Sofia, Bulgaria
 The Mall, Patna, Patna, Bihar, India
 Mall St. Matthews, formerly The Mall, Louisville, Kentucky, US
 The Mall (Bromley), a shopping centre in southeast London, UK
 Lists of shopping malls

Other places

 The Mall, or the Esplanade of the European Parliament, Brussels
 The Mall (Cleveland), a 1903 long public park in down-town Cleveland, Ohio
 The Mall, Kanpur, the central business district of the city Kanpur, Uttar Pradesh, India
 The Mall, Lahore, a road in Lahore, Pakistan
 Mall, Ranga Reddy, a village in Telangana, India
 The National Mall, an open-area national park in downtown Washington, D.C.
 The Mall, Armagh, a cricket ground in Armagh, Northern Ireland, UK
 The Mall, London, the landmark ceremonial approach road to Buckingham Palace, City of Westminster, Central London
 Pall Mall, London, is a street in the St James's area of the City of Westminster, Central London

Mall operators
 The Mall Fund, which owns "The Mall" shopping centres in the United Kingdom
 The Mall Group, which owns "The Mall" shopping centres in Thailand

People with the name
 Joel Mall (born 1991), Swiss football goalkeeper
 Mac Mall, West Coast rapper

Arts, entertainment, and media
 Mall (album), a 1991 album by Gang of Four
 Mall (film), a 2014 film by Linkin Park's turntablist Joe Hahn
 Mall (soundtrack), a soundtrack album from the film
 "Mall" (song), a 2017 song by Eugent Bushpepa that represented Albania in the Eurovision Song Contest 2018
 "Mall", by C418 from Minecraft - Volume Beta, 2013

Other uses
 MALL, a protein
 Mall Airways, regional airline in eastern United States and Canada from 1973 to 1989
 Mobile-assisted language learning (MALL), language learning that is assisted or enhanced through the use of a handheld mobile device

See also
 6teen, a Canadian sitcom whose working title was The Mall
 Mall of Arabia (disambiguation)
 Mall Plaza (disambiguation)
 Mall Road (disambiguation)
 
 Malla (disambiguation)
 MALS (disambiguation)
 Maul (disambiguation)
 Mole (disambiguation)